Encanto (lit. "charm"), is a municipality located in Rio Grande do Norte, Brazil, located within the microregion of Serra de São Miguel and mesoregion of Oeste Potiguar. According to IBGE, the estimated population in 2020 was 5,668 inhabitants. The territorial area is 126 km² and was created in 1963.

See also
List of cities in Brazil
List of municipalities in Rio Grande do Norte

References

External links
 

Municipalities in Rio Grande do Norte